Epping is a suburb of Sydney, in the Australian state of New South Wales, 18 kilometres north-west of the Sydney central business district in the local government area of the City of Parramatta. Epping is located in the Northern Sydney region, which is sometimes simply referred to as the “North-West” or North Shore.
The suburb is the most north-eastern area of the City of Parramatta. North Epping is a separate suburb to the north and under a different council, Hornsby Shire.

History
The Wallumettagal Aboriginal tribe lived in the area between the Lane Cove River and Parramatta River. In 1792, Governor Arthur Phillip began the granting of parcels of lands to marines, and the area was referred to on Phillip's maps as the Field of Mars, Mars being the Roman god of war. It contained the area of what is now Epping, along with the surrounding suburbs of Ryde and Marsfield.

Epping railway station was opened on 17 September 1886, originally named "Field of Mars", and quickly renamed to "Carlingford" on 5 April 1887.  The Post Office was opened on 16 October 1889, originally named "East Carlingford".

In 1899 the suburb name of Epping was adopted following the suggestion by a local landowner William Midson (1849–1924), after a town near Epping Forest in Essex, where his father was born.  At this time, the names of the post office and the railway station were both changed to Epping.  The land from the Field of Mars was broken up into farms and orchards, and after World War II it started to convert to residential use.  Areas which had previously been reserved as part of the green belt scheme became available in 1948.

The Seven Network had its headquarters and television production studios in Epping until 2009. The site is now occupied by residential apartments.

Until 2016, parts of Epping were under three different councils: Hornsby Shire, City of Ryde and City of Parramatta. A 2015 review of local government boundaries recommended that all of Epping be amalgamated into the City of Parramatta, and this became effective on 12 May 2016.

Commercial area

Lands around Epping Railway Station are zoned for commercial use. There are businesses including newsagencies, pharmacies, Asian grocers and restaurants. To the west of the station, there is a Coles supermarket, a RSL Club and a pub (the Epping Hotel) on Rawson Street.

Redevelopment as "Urban Renewal Area"
A major re-development of the Epping Town Centre is planned as part of the NSW government's "Urban Renewal Area" programme (originally called the "Urban Activation Precincts" programme). The changes to zoning for this programme cover 54 hectares, including provision for building heights of 8 to 22 storeys for mixed commercial and residential use within a 400-metre radius of the railway station, and about 3,750 additional homes within 800 metres of it.  These zoning changes were finalized and approved in March 2014, although residents have expressed concerns about issues including traffic management, lack of parking, storm water drainage and access to schools.

The first major project under this programme was scheduled to be Grocon's amalgamation of four lots at 30-42 Oxford Street, acquired in September 2015 for a cost of $56 million. Plans for a 16-storey development of more than 250 apartments for a total value of more than $300 million were lodged with the council.  However, in early 2016 they sold the blocks. In late 2019, the "Oxford Central" development of 251 or 252 apartments, car parking and retail was completed on the site by developer Greaton and construction company Ceerose.

Transport

Epping railway station is a junction station on the Northern Line of the Sydney Trains network, the Central Coast & Newcastle Line of the NSW TrainLink network, and the new rapid transit Sydney Metro Northwest since its opening on 26 May 2019.

Bus services are operated by Busways and Hillsbus. The M2 Hills Motorway runs along the northern border to the Sydney CBD. Epping Road is a major arterial road in the area that runs east from the railway station to the Pacific Highway.

In spite of the range of public transport options, the 2016 census found that only 37% of employed people travelled to work on public transport, compared to 51% who travelled by car (either as driver or as passenger).

Community facilities

The council and other organisations provide a number of community facilities. These include:
 Epping Aquatic and Leisure Centre (also known as Dence Park Aquatic Centre) off 26 Stanley Road, features a heated  outdoor 50-metre pool, a warmer heated  "learn to swim" pool, a covered toddlers' play pool, a gymnasium and a kiosk/coffee shop. A range of classes and training is held at the centre.
 Epping Branch Library, at 1 Chambers Court (off Pembroke Street) is a branch of City of Parramatta Library and formerly a branch of Hornsby Shire Library. Membership is free and provides access to a wide range of services.
 West Epping Community Centre is on the corner of Dent and Downing Streets, beside West Epping Park and Oval. Capacity: 100 people. Attached to the Community Centre is the West Epping Community Preschool which shares the two enclosed playgrounds.
 Epping Community Centre at 9 Oxford Street, near the railway station. Capacity: 300 people (all areas combined). Formerly known as the Epping School of Arts, the community centre was designed by Lord Livingstone Ramsay, an architect who was President of Hornsby Shire from 1909 until 1913. It was built in three stages between 1906 and 1916, and officially opened in 1909. The building has a large auditorium with a stage, two meeting rooms, a commercial standard kitchen, and a second smaller hall downstairs.
 Epping Leisure and Learning Centre at 1 Chambers Court (off Pembroke Street), downstairs from the Epping Branch Library. Capacity: 100 people.
 Epping Creative Centre at 26 Stanley Road, beside the entrance to Dence Park Aquatic Centre. Capacity: 100 people. This centre has an emphasis on creative and educational leisure activities. Epping Creative Centre was opened in September 1989, originally in the back rooms of the Dence Park building, then in 1999 the council granted full use of the premises.
 Epping YMCA at 15 Ward Street caters for the diverse ages, interests and abilities of the surrounding community. In 2012, a million-dollar redevelopment saw the family centre substantially modernised. Facilities include a health club, group fitness studio, one-court indoor stadium, community program room, international standard gymnastics arena, and tennis courts.

Some schools and churches also have halls and other facilities that can be made available for community uses.

Parks, playgrounds, sports fields

Churches
 Chester Street Uniting Church (incorporates Oxford Street Uniting Church)
 Chinese Lutheran Church
 Epping Baptist Church
 Epping Church of Christ
 Epping Gospel Chapel
 Epping Presbyterian Church
 Epping Seventh-day Adventist Church
 Life Way Church (a Lutheran Church, known as St. Mark's until March 2014)
 North Side Chinese Alliance Church
 Northern Districts Chinese Christian Church
 Our Lady Help of Christians (Roman Catholic) Church
 Presbyterian Reformed Church Epping
 St. Alban's (Anglican), St. Aidan's – West Epping (Anglican) – part of the Epping Parish 

 West Epping Uniting Church

Schools
 Arden Anglican School (formerly the Catholic girls' school Our Lady of Mercy College)
 Epping Boys High School (located in Marsfield)
 Epping Heights Public School
 Epping North Public School
 Epping Public School
 Epping West Public School 
 Our Lady Help of Christians Catholic Primary School

Formerly the American International School of Sydney was located here, until its closure in 2009.

Demographics

According to the Australian Bureau of Statistics' 2016 census, Epping had a population of 23,688, of whom 11,697 (49.4%) were male and 11,992 (50.6%) were female.  
 Ethnic diversity  41.4% of people were born in Australia. The most common countries of birth were China 18.9%, South Korea 7.4%, India 6.0%, Hong Kong 5.4% and Malaysia 1.8%. 38.5% of people only spoke English at home. Other languages spoken at home included Mandarin 20.6%, Cantonese 12.0%, Korean 9.1%, Hindi 2.6% and Tamil 1.4%.
 Age distribution The median age of people in Epping was 36 years (national median is 38). Children aged under 15 years made up 17% of the population (18.7% nationally) and people aged 65 years and over made up 13.2% of the population (15.8% nationally).
 Income  Median weekly household income was $1,973, compared to the national average of $1,438.
 Housing  More than three quarters (78.5%) of private dwellings were family households, 15.6% were single person households and 5.9% were group households.  Stand-alone houses accounted for 55.5% of occupied dwellings, while 32.2% were flats, units or apartments and 12.0% were semi-detached. The average household size was 2.9 people.
 Religion  The most commonly reported religious affiliations in the 2016 census were No Religion 36.1%, Catholic 15.1% and Anglican 8.4%.  In the fifteen years from 2001 to 2016, the Census shows that the largest change in religion was the number of people who were not affiliated with any religion, which increased from 16.6% to 36.1% of the population.

Government
At a local government level, Epping lies solely within the City of Parramatta Local Government Area.

At a state level, Epping is mostly represented by the electoral district of Epping, with a small area on the southern edge of Chesterfield Road that is within the Electoral district of Ryde.

At a federal level, Epping falls in the Division of Bennelong.

References

External links

  [CC-By-SA]

 
Suburbs of Sydney
Populated places established in 1899
1899 establishments in Australia